A Coruña railway station, also known as A Coruña-San Cristovo, is a railway terminus in A Coruña, Spain.

Location 
The station is located in Avenida do Ferrocarril, next to Rolda de Outeiro, in the neighbourhood of Os Mallos-Estación, relatively far from center but connected by bus. There is another station in the city, San Diego, with goods sidings.

History and architectural design 
The station building was built in 1935 in a rationalist style, inspired by the Helsinki Central railway station. Its architect was Antonio Gascué Echeverría.

Services 
Two railway lines terminate at this station. They begin in León and Zamora and connect A Coruña with central Spain. High-speed trains connect the city with Santiago de Compostela, Ourense-Empalme, Pontevedra and Vigo-Guixar. Regional lines also connect the city with Lugo, Monforte de Lemos and Ferrol. Intercity trains depart to Madrid, Barcelona, and the Basque Country, passing through many other important Spanish northern cities.

References

External links
 A Coruña station listing at Adif website

Railway stations in Galicia (Spain)
Transport in A Coruña
Railway stations in Spain opened in 1935